Acrolepia asiatica is a moth of the family Acrolepiidae. It was described by Reinhard Gaedike in 1971. It is found in China.

References

Moths described in 1971
Acrolepiidae